is a 2011 Japanese anime film.

Plot

Legend of the Millennium Dragon (aka Onigamiden) starts off with a battle between samurai and Oni, "visualized demons that seem to be made of smoke"
.  It does not go well for the samurai and as the Oni prepare to make their final push to destroy a local temple, but Monk Gen'un wipes them all out in one blow with his magic powers.  The film then shifts focus over to Jun Tendo, a shy teenage boy, who is transported 1200 years into Japan's past to the Heian era. There, he must enlist the aid of the dragon Yamata no Orochi to resolve a war between humans and Oni.  He is bullied over and over because of his weak appearance and lack of skills.  Jun is then followed and attacked by an Oni, which he runs away from.  While running, Jun finds himself hiding in the temple of Monk Gen'un and is confronted with the truth.  Monk Gen'un starts by telling Jun that he is being targeted by the dark monsters and about the war between humans and Oni back in the Heian era.  Jun passes out and wakes up at the temple where he meets Raiko Minamoto, a highly skilled swordsman that fights alongside of Gen'un.  Jun is treated as royalty and is highly confused.

During the night the temple is attacked by Oni.  The humans retaliate and fight back to protect their temple and their "savior," Jun.  Jun is a descendant of the Magatama clan with a birthmark on his left shoulders.  Only direct bloodlines with that birthmark can awaken the full powers of a mystical dragon named Orochi.  In order to summon the dragon to save Raiko and everyone else in the village, Jun must chant the incantation.  Jun sees that Raiko is in deep trouble and screams his name while awaking the powerful dragon in the process without the incantation.  Jun awakes finding himself riding on the back of Orochi, which becomes Jun's servant and source of power.

Jun comes in conflict with Mizuha, an Oni, and find out that they are not the demons that everyone makes them out to be.  Instead of being demons, the Oni are regular people that wears a mask which causes the visualization of the demons.  Jun shortly finds out a different story than what Gen'un has told him from the Oni and now wants answers.  He feels both side of the stories and does not know whom to trust.  Mizuha singles out Jun and asked him to join them and fight to project their cause, but Jun refuses to make such a quick decision because he wants to trust both side.  Jun gets pressured by the Mizuha and calls upon Orochi to escape.  Mizuha jumps on Orochi and escapes with Jun, but they soon hit an Oni-free barrier and gets struck down by magic power.  Jun wakes up to find himself with Tsuna and Kinta, Raiko's fellow swordsman's, who has been searching for Jun to meet up with Raiko.

Gen'un is confronted by a counsel men of the temple and his true plans are exposed.  Jun becomes furious once he finds out that the counsel men dies and calls upon Orochi.  A battle between Oni and Human finally breaks out.  Jun orders to stop the battle, but is attacked by Raiko.  Jun does not recognize Raiko and is told by an Oni that Gen'un used his powers and turned Raiko and his friends into the Four Heavenly Kings "god-powered suits of armor".  Raiko and his friends do not have control over their bodies anymore.  Jun finally learns the evil plans of Gen'un and that the counsel men's assassination was Gen'un's doing.  Gen'un wants to obtain true greatness and powers of a God.

Before stopping Gen'un, Jun has to defeat Raiko first.  Jun knows that Raiko is not evil and has no control over his body.  Jun tries to talk Raiko out of fighting but there is no response until he brings up the death of Raiko's father and how they were ordered to death by Gen'un.  Gen'un notices that Raiko is starting to resist the powers given to him and strikes him down, destroying the power of the heavenly kings and defeating Raiko himself.  Jun begins to take the fight seriously and finally knows what he is fighting for.  Mizuha hands over a small mirror like item and a small dagger that contains his true power.  When placed next to each other, they merge and become a sword that Jun uses to fight.  Gen'un then transforms the Four Heavenly Kings into one giant beast and attacks everyone that gets into his way, even his own people.  Everyone tries desperately to take down Gen'un, but he is just too powerful.  Not wanting anymore bloodshed, Jun unleashes all his powers and begins glowing.  Orochi, who has power over the water and controls all water is transformed into its final form, the true Yamata no Orochi and defeats Gen'un. The film ends with Jun back in his own time and in his school uniform, now with confidence and moving on with his life.

Cast

Reception

Charles Webb wrote in his review that Jun, the main character, spends the first half or so of the movie "whining and repeating things that were just said to him in the form of a question". He also states that it was never discussed why Orochi was "necessary" in the movie.

Jason Yadao wrote in his review for the Honolulu Star-Advertiser that the film is "hamstrung by the story", which he found to be unoriginal. He also observed that many of the secondary characters "just pop up and disappear before we even have a chance to care about them."

Marcello, founder of japancinema.net, agreed, stating "the whole anime lacks a coherent story" and that "characters appear and disappear before the viewer has a chance to get to know them or care about what happens to them." However, he did like that "each frame of this film is hand-drawn, and some of the imagery is quite beautiful, while the supernatural battle scenes are quite epic in scope."

Release
In the US, it was released in a Blu-ray+DVD combo pack on October 4, 2011. It was released on separate Blu-ray and region 2 DVD editions in Scandinavia on October 12, 2011, and it was released in the UK on December 26, 2011.

References

External links
 

 

2011 anime films
Drama anime and manga
Anime films based on novels
Animated films about dragons
Animated films about time travel
Heian period in fiction
Pierrot (company)